Trichocalyx is a genus of plant in family Acanthaceae. It contains the following species:
 Trichocalyx obovatus Balf.f.
 Trichocalyx orbiculatus Balf.f.

 
Acanthaceae genera
Taxonomy articles created by Polbot
Taxa named by Isaac Bayley Balfour